The 1844 Rhode Island gubernatorial election was held on April 3, 1844.

Incumbent Law and Order Governor James Fenner won re-election without opposition.

General election

Candidates
James Fenner, Law and Order, incumbent Governor

Results

References

1844
Rhode Island
Gubernatorial